Ghammas Sport Club is an Iraqi football team based in Ghammas, Al-Qādisiyyah, that plays in Iraq Division Three.

Stadium
In May 2008, the Ministry of Youth and Sports began construction of the Ghammas stadium.

Managerial history
 Mohammed Hadi

See also 
 2000–01 Iraqi Elite League
 2001–02 Iraq FA Cup

References

External links
 Ghammas SC on Goalzz.com
 Iraq Clubs- Foundation Dates

1991 establishments in Iraq
Association football clubs established in 1991
Football clubs in Al-Qādisiyyah